Pregnancy-specific beta-1-glycoprotein 4 is a protein that in humans is encoded by the PSG4 gene.

References

Further reading